Filoprotococcus is a genus of green algae in the order Ulotrichales. It was once regarded as a synonym of Trichosarcina. However, it is now accepted as a genus in its own right, and Trichosarcina is considered taxonomically uncertain.

References

Ulvophyceae genera
Ulotrichales